Jonathan Carroll is a Democratic member of the Illinois House of Representatives from the 57th district. The 57th district, located in the Chicago metropolitan area, includes all or parts of Arlington Heights, Buffalo Grove, Des Plaines, Glenview, Mount Prospect, Northbrook, Palatine, Prospect Heights and Wheeling.

Early life and career
Prior to serving in the General Assembly, Carroll was a special education teacher and currently works in private practice helping individuals with cognitive challenges like ADHD. Carroll has a degree in communications from DePaul University, and an M.A. in special education from Northeastern Illinois University. He is a certified special education teacher and has managed the private Carroll Educational Group for several years, helping clients with special needs. He is a director of the Portes Foundation, which makes grants for medical and life sciences research.

Illinois House of Representatives
On October 2, 2017, Democratic incumbent Elaine Nekritz resigned from the Illinois House of Representatives. The Democratic Representative Committee for the 57th Representative District selected Jonathan Carroll to fill the vacancy. Carroll was sworn into office on October 3, 2017. Upon being sworn in, he replaced Nekritz on the Committee on Government Consolidation & Modernization and the Committee on Cybersecurity, Data Analytics & Information Technology. He was also assigned to the Committee on Mass Transit; and the Committee on Elementary & Secondary Education Committee.

In 2019, Carroll authored a food-labeling law benefiting people with food allergies. In 2020, Carroll authored legislation outlawing schools' use of isolation rooms as a disciplinary tactic.

Committee assignments
As of July 3, 2022, Representative Carroll is a member of the following Illinois House Committees:

 (Chairman of) Consumer Protection Committee (HCON)
 Counties & Townships Committee (HCOT)
 Executive Committee (HEXC)
 Family Law & Probate Subcommittee (HJUA-FLAW)
 Financial Protection Subcommittee (HCON-FINA)
 Insurance Committee (HINS)
 International Trade & Commerce Committee (HITC)
 Judiciary - Civil Committee (HJUA)
 Product Safety Subcommittee (HCON-PROD)
 Public Utilities Committee (HPUB)

Electoral history

2018 
In 2018, Carroll won the Democratic nomination and Mary Battinus won the Republican nomination for the 57th district. Battinus dropped out of the election two months after the primary. The Republican Party did not nominate a replacement candidate and Carroll ran unopposed.

2020 
In the 2020 election, Carroll was the only candidate to file to run in the primary election or general election.

2022 
In 2022, Carroll won the Democratic nomination and Rory Welch won the Republican nomination for the 57th district. In the general election, Carroll defeated Welch with 22,553 votes (63.63%) to Welch's 12,889 votes (36.37%).

References

External links
 Jonathan Carroll's profile via the Illinois General Assembly
 Official Website of Rep. Johnathan Carroll, constituent services website
 Carroll for Illinois, campaign website

Year of birth missing (living people)
Living people
DePaul University alumni
Educators from Illinois
Democratic Party members of the Illinois House of Representatives
Northeastern Illinois University alumni
People from Northbrook, Illinois
21st-century American politicians
Jewish American state legislators in Illinois